Together is the first collaborative album by American Christian music female artists Sandi Patty and Kathy Troccoli. It was released on July 27, 1999 on Monarch Records. With Patty and Troccoli still signed to their Christian music labels Word and Reunion respectively, it is Patty's nineteenth album and Troccoli's ninth album. It features Patty singing the Gershwin songbook and Troccoli singing Broadway show tunes. Patty and Troccoli sing duets on three songs. "I Remember" performed by Troccoli is one of two original solo songs produced and arranged by Robbie Buchanan and was released to mainstream AC radio as the lead single. Patty sings the other original solo song "The Last Day" which was written by Brenda Russell.

Track listing

Critical reception 
Jonathan Widran of AllMusic gave Together 4 1/2 out of 5 stars saying "Best known for their popularity in the Christian music market, these two singing dynamos create a nearly religious experience combining Troccoli's love for Judy Garland's legendary performances and Patty's attachment to Gershwin, and then meeting in the middle for two brand new odes to nostalgia, the passion ballad 'The Last Day' and the lush, almost tearful 'I Remember.' These two new numbers were produced and arranged by Robbie Buchanan, and while they are nice tunes covering the theme of looking back, they pale in comparison to the standards. Their performances are exquisite, but some of the credit needs to go to the slew of arrangers and musical settings they work with." Widran also said "This labor of love's tag line 'A Celebration of Classic Popular Songs from Garland To Gershwin' says it all. It's hard to miss with such fine material, but even harder when those singing it have felt the passion of every note."

Radio singles

References

1999 albums
Sandi Patty albums
Kathy Troccoli albums
Collaborative albums
Covers albums